WPHN is a radio station licensed to Gaylord, Michigan broadcasting on 90.5 FM.  WPHN airs a format consisting of Christian contemporary music with some Christian talk and teaching, and is the flagship station of The Promise FM.  The station serves Northern Michigan and is owned by Northern Christian Radio, Inc.

Translators
WPHN is also heard in Newberry, Michigan through a translator on 88.7 FM, and in the Petoskey, Michigan area through a translator on 99.7 FM.

References

External links 
WPHN's website

Contemporary Christian radio stations in the United States
Radio stations established in 1985
1985 establishments in Michigan
PHN